is a railway station in Higashi-ku, Nagoya, Aichi Prefecture, Japan, operated by the Transportation Bureau City of Nagoya.

This station provides access to Tōkai Television Broadcasting and Nagoya Performing Arts Center.

Lines

 (Station number: S06)

Station layout

Platforms

History
The station opened on 10 September 1989.

References

Railway stations in Japan opened in 1989
Railway stations in Aichi Prefecture